USRC may refer to:

 United Services Recreation Club, Hong Kong, a social and sports club
 USRC Tigers RFC, a rugby union club
 Union Station Rail Corridor, the former Toronto Terminals Railway trackage
 United States Revenue Cutter Service